Julius of Lyon was the seventh bishop of Lyon. He succeeded Verus in the second half of the 3rd century.

We know very little about him and his life, except that it establishes Philetus as second Abbot of the Abbey of Île Barbe. His name is known to us from the various lists of the first bishops of Lyon and chronicles the history of the Church of Lyon. His episcopate is one of the dark periods of the religious history of Lyon after the first well most famous bishops.

References 

Bishops of Lyon
3rd-century bishops in Gaul
Year of birth unknown
Year of death missing